Luis Alberto "Trapito" Carranza (born 15 June 1972) is a retired Argentine footballer who played as a midfielder.

Career
Carranza started his career in 1991 with Racing Club de Avellaneda. In 1992, he joined Boca Juniors where he was part of the squad that won the Apertura 1992 and the Copa de Oro. He played a total of 106 games for the club in all competitions, scoring 13 goals.

Carranza then had a spell with Racing Club's fiercest rivals; Independiente before joining San Lorenzo where he became a key player.

After suffering an injury in Argentina, Carranza had a short spell in Mexico with Veracruz before returning to Argentina to play for Estudiantes de La Plata.

In 2000 Carranza played for Peruvian side Universitario de Deportes and then in October 2000 Carranza joined Dundee, where he partnered with Claudio Caniggia in midfield. Carranza, like the majority of players at Dundee, suffered redundancy in November 2003 but signed for Raith Rovers two days later in a short-term deal.

Carranza returned to Argentina to play for his hometown club Quilmes Atlético Club. He then had a spell with Club Alumni de Villa María in the lower leagues of Argentine football.

In 2005 Carranza played for Guaraní of Paraguay before returning to the lower leagues of Argentine football to play for Almirante Brown and then Ceramica Argentina of Chivilcoy.

References

External links 
 
 Luis Alberto Carranza at BDFA.com.ar 

1972 births
People from Quilmes
Living people
Argentine footballers
Argentina international footballers
Argentine expatriate footballers
Racing Club de Avellaneda footballers
Boca Juniors footballers
Club Atlético Independiente footballers
San Lorenzo de Almagro footballers
C.D. Veracruz footballers
Estudiantes de La Plata footballers
Dundee F.C. players
Raith Rovers F.C. players
Argentine Primera División players
Scottish Premier League players
Club Universitario de Deportes footballers
Quilmes Atlético Club footballers
Expatriate footballers in Mexico
Expatriate footballers in Paraguay
Expatriate footballers in Peru
Expatriate footballers in Scotland
Argentine expatriate sportspeople in Mexico
Argentine expatriate sportspeople in Scotland
Association football midfielders
Sportspeople from Buenos Aires Province